Thamarakulam or Thamarakkulam is a business centre and neighbourhood of Kollam city in Kerala, India. Thamarakulam is a part of Downtown Kollam area and is near Chinnakada. Ganapathy temple in Thamarakulam is a very famous Hindu temple and worship centre in Kollam district. Caparisoned elephants from this temple is an unavoidable thing during the celebrations of Kollam Pooram. 'Ezhunnellippu' of elephants from Thamarakulam temple is a regular ritual of Kollam Pooram. Kollam Development Authority office is situated at Thamarakulam.

Project Submission for Thamarakulam during Partner Kerala Meet-2014
The government of Kerala organized an urban development meet in the name 'Partner Kerala' during the month February, 2014. Kollam Municipal Corporation and Kollam Development Authority submitted some proposals in that meet for Thamarakulam. They are,:

Kollam Municipal Corporation unveiled its plan to construct a commercial complex-cum-convention centre and multilevel car parking at Thamarakulam at a total cost of Rs 178.53 crore.
Kollam Development Authority proposed a shopping mall, office complex and exhibition-cum-trading centre for micro, small and medium enterprises at Thamarakkulam at a cost of Rs 80 crore.

See also
 Kollam
 Thangassery
 Mundakkal
 Chinnakada
 Andamukkam City Bus Stand

References

Neighbourhoods in Kollam